is an American-born  Japanese language author. Levy was born in California and educated in Taiwan, the US, and Japan. He is one of the first Americans to write modern literature in Japanese, and his work has won the Noma Literary New Face Prize and the Yomiuri Prize, among other literary prizes.

Biography 
Levy was born in Berkeley, California, on 29 November 1950 to a Polish-American mother and a Jewish father. His father named him after a friend who was imprisoned in an internment camp during World War II. Levy's father was a diplomat, and the family moved around between Taiwan, Hong Kong, Japan and the United States. He graduated from Princeton University with a bachelor's degree in East Asian studies, and later received his doctorate from the same school for studying the poet Kakinomoto no Hitomaro.

While at Princeton, Levy studied the Man'yōshū. His English translation of the text was one of the finalists of the 1982 U.S. National Book Award in the Translation category. He has referred to the Man'yōshū scholar Susumu Nakanishi as his mentor. After working as an assistant professor at Princeton, he moved to Stanford University and taught there. He later left and moved to Tokyo.

Levy gained attention in Japan as the first foreigner to win the Noma Literary Award for New Writers, which he received in 1992 for his work A Room Where the Star-Spangled Banner Cannot Be Heard. In 1996, his story Tiananmen was nominated for the Akutagawa Prize. For his contributions to the introduction of Japanese literature to foreign readers, he was honored with a Japan Foundation Special Prize in 2007. In 2017, he won the Yomiuri Prize.

Recognition
 14th Noma Literary New Face Prize, 1992
 Japan Foundation Award, 2007
 68th Yomiuri Prize, 2017

Works

Novels

Literary criticism and essays

Man'yōshū scholarship 
Hitomaro and the Birth of Japanese Lyricism (Princeton University Press 1984)
The Ten Thousand Leaves: A Translation of the Man Yoshu, Japan's Premier Anthology of Classical Poetry (Princeton Library of Asian Translations) (Princeton University Press 1987)
 Love Songs from the Man'yoshu (Kodansha International 2000)
Man'yo Luster  (Pie Books 2002)

Translations 
 Otohiko Kaga's

See also
 C. W. Nicol
 David Zoppetti

References

External links 
 Hideo Levy at J'Lit Books from Japan 
 Synopsis of A Room Where the Star-Spangled Banner Cannot Be Heard at JLPP (Japanese Literature Publishing Project) 
 JF Video Square Video of acceptance speech for Japan Foundation Special Prize.
  Video of lecture given at Stanford University Department of East Asian Languages and Cultures, February 11, 2010.

1950 births
Living people
American Japanologists
American people of Polish descent
American translators
Exophonic writers
Japanese–English translators
Japanese-language writers
Man'yōshū
National Book Award winners
American male non-fiction writers
Yomiuri Prize winners